Eucosma glomerana is a species of tortricid moth in the family Tortricidae.

The MONA or Hodges number for Eucosma glomerana is 3051.

References

Further reading

 

Eucosmini